Nancy Kendrick is an American philosopher and William and Elsie Prentice Professor of Philosophy at Wheaton College (Massachusetts). She is known for her expertise on George Berkeley and has been president of the International Berkeley Society since 2015.

See also
Stephen Daniel

References

External links
 Nancy Kendrick at Wheaton College

21st-century American philosophers
George Berkeley scholars
Philosophy academics
Living people
Wheaton College (Massachusetts) faculty
University of Illinois Urbana-Champaign alumni
Year of birth missing (living people)
Distinguished professors of philosophy